Gyrinus marinus is a species of beetle native to the Palearctic, including Europe. In Europe, it is only found in Austria, Belarus, Belgium, Bosnia and Herzegovina, Croatia, the Czech Republic, mainland Denmark, Estonia, Finland, mainland France, Germany, mainland Italy, Latvia, mainland Norway, Poland, Russia, Slovakia, Sweden, Switzerland, the Netherlands, Ukraine and Yugoslavia.

References

Gyrinidae
Beetles described in 1808